Geleh Deh Kuh (also Romanized as Geleh Deh Kūh; also known as Geleh Deh) is a village in Kuhsar Rural District, in the Central District of Hashtrud County, East Azerbaijan Province, Iran. At the 2006 census, its population was 94, in 16 families.

References 

Towns and villages in Hashtrud County